On April 3, 1990 the 9th National Assembly passed the Law on Amending the Constitution of the People's Republic of Bulgaria (published in the "Official Gazette", no. 29 of April 10, 1990) which abolished the State Council, the collective presidency of the Communist era. The State Council was replaced by the posts of Chairman (President) and Deputy Chairman (Vice-President) of the Republic.

Selection procedure 
According to Art. 91, para. 1, the President was to be elected by the National Assembly by a majority of 2/3 of those present, and held office for the duration of the Assembly (in practice, five years). Any Bulgarian citizen who was at least 40 years old and eligible to be elected to parliament was eligible to stand for President. (Art. 91, para. 2)

The Vice President of the Republic was elected by the National Assembly at the proposal of the President by a simple majority of those present.  (Art. 94, para. 1) His term ran concurrently with that of the President.

The President and Vice President were limited to two terms. (art. 95, para. 1).

Procedure for termination
Office of the President (President) of the Republic and Deputy Chairman (Vice President) may be terminated early by the National Assembly at the proposal of at least one third of MPs when they violated the Constitution or oath. The decision is taken by secret ballot and by a majority of two thirds of MPs (Art. 97, para. 1).

When the office of the President (President) of the Republic and Deputy Chairman (Vice President) be terminated as and when they wish, or death within one month to elect a new chairman (president) or Deputy Chairman (Vice-President). When the National Assembly is not in session, it shall be convened by its President (Art. 97, para. 3).

Election results
The first elections for the chairman (president) of the PRB are produced on April 3, 1990 On behalf of the parliamentary group of the Communist Party and the Agrarian Union for the post is proposed Chairman of the State Council Petar Mladenov, who was elected unanimously. Immediately after the election he was sworn in and officially assume office. The decision to select a chairman (president) of the Republic was published in the "Official Gazette", number 29 of April 10, 1990.

References

"Official Gazette", no. 29 of April 10, 1990

Bulgaria
1990 in Bulgaria
April 1990
April 1990 events in Europe